BomBora is a family steel roller coaster currently operating at Lagoon in Farmington, Utah, United States. It is located just outside Lagoon-A-Beach. The name of the coaster comes from an indigenous Australian term for "a submerged reef" or "a turbulent area of sea over such a reef".

History
Construction started in 2010, after lockers for Lagoon-A-Beach were demolished. The roller coaster opened in 2011.

Experience
The ride starts with a left turn out of the station and to the lift-hill. At the top of the lift-hill riders go down the highest drop in the ride and into a series of drops and twists while music by The Beach Boys (or another tune with similar style and theme) is playing, before hitting the final brake run and returning to the station.

References

External links

Lagoon (amusement park)
2011 establishments in Utah